Douglas F. Watt is an American neuropsychologist, with specialties in emotion and Alzheimer's disease. He has published theories on neuroscience related to emotion and consciousness.

Early life and education
Watt graduated from Harvard University with a Bachelor of Science in psychology and religion in 1972. He received a masters of arts from Northeastern University in 1976 and a Ph.D. from Boston College in 1985.

Career
From 1992 to 2004, he served as the Director of Neuropsychology/Psychology at the Quincy Medical Center, Quincy, Massachusetts.

Bibliography

References

1950 births
Living people
21st-century American psychologists
Boston College alumni
Harvard College alumni
Northeastern University alumni
Scientists from Chicago
20th-century American psychologists